Morningside Cemetery may refer to:

 Morningside Cemetery, Edinburgh, Scotland
 Morningside Cemetery (Malone, New York), United States

See also
 Balmoral Cemetery, Brisbane – located in Morningside, Brisbane, Queensland, Australia
 San Fernando Pioneer Memorial Cemetery – formerly Morningside Cemetery, in Los Angeles, California, United States